Events from the year 1882 in China.

Incumbents
 Guangxu Emperor (8th year)
 Regent: Empress Dowager Cixi (22nd year)

References